The Royal Order of the White Eagle was a Royal Order in the Kingdom of Serbia (1883–1918) and the Kingdom of Yugoslavia (1918–1945). 

It continues as a dynastic order, with appointments currently made by Alexander, Crown Prince of Yugoslavia.

History
King Milan I of Serbia instituted the Order of the White Eagle on 23 January 1883, concurrently with the Order of St. Sava. The Order had five classes and was conferred on Serbian and Yugoslav citizens for achievements in peace or war, or for special merits to the Crown, the state and nation. In the period between 1883 and 1898 Order of the White Eagle was the highest award  in the Kingdom of Serbia. In 1898 the Royal Order of Miloš the Great took precedence over the White Eagle and in 1904 the former was replaced by the Order of Karađorđe's Star.

After his accession to the throne in 1903, King Peter I of Serbia continued awarding the Order of the White Eagle, but the reverse of the medallion had the year of the proclamation of the Kingdom (1883) instead of the cipher of Milan I.

The white eagle with wings displayed was re-established as the State Arms of Serbia, symbol descended from the Emperors of Byzantium. The order had a War Merit Division, with crossed swords between the Royal Crown and eagle's heads, that was introduced in 1915, and conferred for conspicuous bravery of the officers in the field.

In 1945, with the end of the monarchy, the order was in effect exiled, but it was revived in the Socialist Federal Republic of Yugoslavia as a decoration with a War Merit Division. Since the end of Yugoslavia, the Royal Order continues to be awarded by Alexander, Crown Prince of Yugoslavia, as the senior representative of the Crown. His awards include Angelo de Mojana di Cologna, Grand Master of the Sovereign Military Order of Malta, and posthumous conferment upon three Crown Council Members. On 22 August 2016, Prince Alexander awarded the Grand Cross of the Order to husbands of three princesses of the royal family, Sir Desmond de Silva, a former United Nations War Crimes Prosecutor, Mr Gregory Thune-Larsen, and Mr Austin Prichard-Levy.

Description

The Order of the White Eagle has five degrees, and can be awarded with swords for the military services, with or without swords for civil merit. The Order is organized into five classes:

 1st Class – Grand Cross
 2nd Class – Grand Officer's Cross
 3rd Class – Commander's Cross
 4th Class – Officer's Cross
 5th Class – Knight's Cross

The sash of the Order is worn from the left shoulder to the right hip.

Recipients 

Grand Masters
 Milan I of Serbia
 Alexander I of Serbia
 Peter I of Serbia
 Alexander I of Yugoslavia
 Peter II of Yugoslavia
Grand Crosses
 Alois Lexa von Aehrenthal
 Archduke Albrecht, Duke of Teschen
 Alexander I of Serbia
 Alexander of Battenberg
 Count Kasimir Felix Badeni
 Andrew Bertie
 Otto von Bismarck
 Julian Byng, 1st Viscount Byng of Vimy
 Armand De Ceuninck
 Desmond de Silva (barrister)
 Botho zu Eulenburg
 Charles Granville Fortescue
 Archduke Franz Ferdinand of Austria
 Frederick Francis III, Grand Duke of Mecklenburg-Schwerin
 Frederick III, German Emperor
 George VI
 Agenor Maria Gołuchowski
 Prince Henry of Prussia (1862–1929)
 Higashifushimi Yorihito
 Konstantin of Hohenlohe-Schillingsfürst
 Prince Kuni Kuniyoshi
 Aleksey Kuropatkin
 Prince Leopold of Bavaria
 Archduke Leopold Salvator of Austria
 Louis IV, Grand Duke of Hesse
 Archduke Ludwig Viktor of Austria
 Milan I of Serbia
 George Milne, 1st Baron Milne
 Prince Nicholas of Romania
 Nicholas I of Montenegro
 Danail Nikolaev
 Đurđe Ninković
 Archduke Otto of Austria (1865–1906)
 Radomir Putnik
 Sir William Robertson, 1st Baronet
 Prince Rudolf of Liechtenstein
 Andrew Hamilton Russell
 Edward Rydz-Śmigły
 Charles Spencer, 6th Earl Spencer
 Vladimir Sukhomlinov
 Jan Syrový
 Nikola Tesla
 Ernest Troubridge
 Queen Victoria
 Illarion Vorontsov-Dashkov
 Wilhelmina of the Netherlands
 Sergei Witte
 August zu Eulenburg
Grand Officers
 Charles James Briggs
 Sholto Douglas, 1st Baron Douglas of Kirtleside
 Alexander Godley
 Jevrem Grujić
 Dimitrios Ioannou
 Lyman Lemnitzer
 Joseph T. McNarney
 Živojin Bumbaširević
Commanders
 William Wallace Atterbury
 Herbert Henry Austin
 Edward Chaytor
 Cyril Clowes
 Webb Gillman
 Talbot Hobbs
 Ivan Kolev (general)
 Arthur Laumann
 Svetozar T. Nešić
 Tadeusz Piskor
 Roman Sondermajer
 Stepa Stepanović
 Prince Tomislav of Yugoslavia
 Bolesław Wieniawa-Długoszowski
Officers
 John Boswell (rugby union)
 Willy Coppens
 James Durrant
 Cecil Foott
 Gilbert W. M. Green
 Sir James Horlick, 4th Baronet
 Sergěj Ingr
 Carl Jess
 John Meredith (general)
 Curt von Morgen
 Karl von Plettenberg
 Edward Murray Colston, 2nd Baron Roundway
 Claude Taylor (rower)
 Claud Tudor
Knights
 Lionel Gough Arbuthnot
 Ernest Lucas Guest
 Aubrey Herbert
 Richard W. O'Neill
Other or Unknown Classes
 
 Paul Émile Appell
 Léon Bérard
 Afrikan P. Bogaewsky
 John Boswell (rugby union)
 E. T. Burke
 Charles Edward Callwell
 Stanislav Čeček
 Dimitrije Cincar-Marković
 Travers Clarke
 Henry Day
 Anton Denikin
 Viktor Dousmanis
 Dragutin Matić
 Nićifor Dučić
 John Duncan (British Army officer, born 1872)
 Alexander Fisher (sound engineer)
 Archduke Franz Salvator of Austria
 Helen Losanitch Frothingham
 Grigore Gafencu
 Wladimir Giesl von Gieslingen
 Vivian Green-Armytage
 Émile Guépratte
 George Harper
 Herbert Hoover
 Isabel Emslie Hutton
 Elsie Inglis
 Božidar Janković
 Antonija Javornik
 Germanos Karavangelis
 Henry Keary
 Vladimir Kokovtsov
 Alexander Kolchak
 Georgios Kondylis
 Francis Lloyd (British Army officer)
 Herbert Lloyd
 Douglas MacArthur
 Compton Mackenzie
 Rudolf Maister
 Aleksandar Mašin
 William Meldrum (general)
 Draža Mihailović
 Čedomilj Mijatović
 Mikhail Nikolayevich Muravyov
 Milutin Nedić
 Ralph Paget
 Leonidas Paraskevopoulos
 Peter Patton
 Mārtiņš Peniķis
 Milorad Petrović
 Frederick Alfred Pile
 Duncan Pirie
 Alessandro Pirzio Biroli
 Jovan Ristić
 Varnava, Serbian Patriarch
 Ralph Royce
 Nicolae Samsonovici
 Humphry Sandwith
 Maurice Sarrail
 Ivan Smirnov (aviator)
 Leonid Solarević
 Stefan I of Bulgaria
 Nicolae Titulescu
 Essad Pasha Toptani
 Charles Treat
 Đorđe Vajfert
 Charles J. Vopicka
 Maxime Weygand
 Henry Fuller Maitland Wilson
 Wilfrid Woods
 Charles Woollcombe
 František Zach

References 

White Eagle, Order of the
White Eagle (Serbia), Order of the
Awards established in 1883
Awards disestablished in 1945
1883 establishments in Serbia
Orders, decorations, and medals of the Kingdom of Serbia